Memories of Underdevelopment is a 1968 Cuban drama film written and directed by Tomás Gutiérrez Alea. The story is based on a novel by Edmundo Desnoes entitled Inconsolable Memories (Memorias del Subdesarrollo). It was Gutiérrez Alea's fifth film, and probably his most famous worldwide.

The film gathered several awards at international film festivals. It was elected the 144th best film of all time in the Sight & Sound 2012 poll. It was ranked by the New York Times as one of the 10 best films of 1968.

Plot

Sergio, a wealthy bourgeois aspiring writer, decides to stay in Cuba even though his wife and friends flee to Miami. Sergio looks back over the changes in Cuba, from the Cuban Revolution to the missile crisis, the effect of living in what he calls an underdeveloped country, and his relations with his girlfriends Elena and Hanna. Memories of Underdevelopment is a complex character study of alienation during the turmoil of social changes. The film is told in a highly subjective point of view through a fragmented narrative that resembles the way memories function. Throughout the film, Sergio narrates the action, and at times is used as a tool to present bits of political information about the climate in Cuba at the time. In several instances, real-life documentary footage of protests and political events are incorporated into the film and played over Sergio’s narration to expose the audience to the reality of the Revolution. The timeframe of the film is somewhat ambiguous, but it appears to take place over a few months.

Cast
Sergio Corrieri as Sergio Carmona Mendoyo, a bourgeois intellectual
Daisy Granados as Elena, a teenaged girl fond of boleros
Eslinda Nunez as Noemi
Omar Valdés as Pablo
René de la Cruz as Elena's brother
Yolanda Farr as Laura
Ofelia González as Hanna
Edmundo Desnoes as himself / panelist
René Depestre as himself / panelist
Gianni Toti as himself / panelist
David Viñas as himself / panelist
Jack Gelber as himself

Production details

Before the film's release, both the director, Tomás Gutiérrez Alea, and the main actor, Sergio Corrieri, were concerned that the film wouldn’t be successful. The film was largely inexpensive to produce, as it was made without many technological or economic resources, and as a result Gutiérrez Alea feared that his vision wouldn’t translate to the screen.

Another concern of Gutiérrez Alea’s was that Corrieri would seem too young for his part. At the time of shooting in 1968 Corrieri was 28, yet the character was intended to be 38. Gutiérrez Alea and Corrieri worked together to capture the "different rhythm" that Corrieri needed to take on to play the part of someone 10 years his senior in a number of ways, including by dyeing Corrieri’s hair grey.

Hanna, Sergio’s long-lost love in the film, was intended to be a much larger character, but the actress that ended up being cast was not a professional, so the character’s role was reduced.

Because of the political turmoil between the US and Cuba at the time, the US government denied Gutiérrez Alea a visitor’s visa in 1970 when he attempted to enter the US to receive several awards he had won for Memories of Underdevelopment, using the Trading with the Enemy Act as justification.
Sergio's apartment in the film was a penthouse in the FOCSA Building.

Adaptation from novel to film
The film adaptation has generally been regarded as an improvement on the novel. In an interview in 1999, Sergio Corrieri was quoted stating, “I think that Memories is one of the few cases in which the film is better than the novel, because usually the opposite is the case. Almost always the cinematic version of a novel comes up short, but here the film transcended the novel.”  Gutiérrez Alea explains in an interview with Cineaste in 1977 that at a certain point the novel “was to be betrayed, negated and transformed into something else” for it to be successful as a film. Gutiérrez Alea also comments that the author, Desnoes, was fully conscious of the fact that his book would be changed as it was made into a movie, and therefore he was able to keep a positive attitude. Desnoes ended up attending shooting sessions and making valuable suggestions. Desnoes commented that the film achieved a level of artistic success that the novel missed because Gutiérrez Alea “objectivized a world that was shapeless… and still abstract in the book” by adding “social density.”  Desnoes appears himself as a panelist in a round table.

The film was poorly received by some critics because Sergio was an unconventional protagonist. The author of the novel, Edmundo Desnoes, writes of Sergio in Cine Cubano, “that is the tragedy of Sergio. His irony, his intelligence, is a defense mechanism which prevents him from being involved in the reality.”

Reception
Widely acclaimed as one of the best films of its nation and of its era in terms of bringing together art and politics, and described by John King as 'the most interesting exploration of the problem in any cultural medium'. Because many Cubans already had a revolutionary mentality by the time the film was released, it was regarded more as a representation of an outdated stream of thought. Memories of Underdevelopment was popular in the United States. Many American critics were “suitably impressed by the film as a stylistic tour de force as well as a subtle and complex portrait of an uncommitted intellectual from a bourgeois background swept up in a vortex of revolutionary change and the threat of nuclear extinction at the time of the Cuban Missile Crisis.” In an interview with Cineaste Magazine in 1977, Gutiérrez Alea is quoted saying that “Memories was in general much better understood and evaluated in the US because people perceived the attempt to criticize the bourgeois mentality.” 

The film was selected for screening as part of the Cannes Classics section at the 2016 Cannes Film Festival.

See also

Cinema of Cuba

References

External links

Derek Malcolm of the Guardian places "Memorias del Subdesarrollo" at number 54 in his 100 greatest movies
Memories of Underdevelopment: Imaging History an essay by Joshua Jelly-Schapiro at the Criterion Collection

Cuban drama films
Existentialist films
1960s Spanish-language films
Films about the Cuban Missile Crisis
Films about the Cuban Revolution
Films based on Cuban novels
Films directed by Tomás Gutiérrez Alea